To the Top is a 2015 Philippine television reality talent show broadcast by GMA Network. Hosted by Christian Bautista, it premiered on July 25, 2015 on the network's Sabado Star Power sa Gabi line up. The show concluded on September 27, 2015 with a total of 20 episodes.

Cast

Host
 Christian Bautista

Judges
 Ryan Cayabyab
 Moy Ortiz
 Sweet Plantado
 OJ Mariano

Contestants

Three teams were formed among the eighteen contestants of To The Top with six members per team - A, B, and C. Starting out as the team leader, Miko M was grouped with Adrian and Mico C in Team C, while Louie and Joshua were part of the two other teams - A and B respectively.

Ratings
According to AGB Nielsen Philippines' Mega Manila household television ratings, the pilot episode of To the Top earned a 13.5% rating. While the final episode scored a 9.5% rating.

References

2015 Philippine television series debuts
2015 Philippine television series endings
Filipino-language television shows
GMA Network original programming
Philippine reality television series